Bargstedt is the name of the following places in Germany: 

 Bargstedt, Lower Saxony
 Bargstedt, Schleswig-Holstein